Ranunculus flammula, the lesser spearwort, greater creeping spearwort or banewort, is a species of perennial herbaceous plants in the genus Ranunculus (buttercup), growing in damp places throughout the Boreal Kingdom. It flowers June/July. Ranunculus flammula is poisonous.
It is very closely related to R. reptans,  which is distinguished by prostrate and more slender stems, narrower leaves and smaller flowers and is sometimes included within R. flammula sensu lato as a variety (R. flammula var. reptans (L.) E. Meyer).

In addition to other forms of pollination, this plant is adapted to rain-pollination.

Gallery

Illustrations

References

External links
 

flammula
Flora of Asia
Flora of Europe
Flora of North America
Flora of Norway
Plants described in 1753
Taxa named by Carl Linnaeus